Snake Creek Farm Historic District is a national historic district near Hillsville, Virginia. The district encompasses four contributing buildings and one contributing site on Snake Creek Farm. They include the main house, a frame spring house and meathouse, and a frame two-room schoolhouse. Also on the property is a large family cemetery. The main house was built about 1910, and is a 2½-story, double-pile, center-passage-plan frame dwelling.

It was listed on the National Register of Historic Places in 1991.

References

Farms on the National Register of Historic Places in Virginia
Historic districts on the National Register of Historic Places in Virginia
Buildings and structures in Carroll County, Virginia
National Register of Historic Places in Carroll County, Virginia